Teressa may refer to:
 Teressa Island, one of the Nicobar Islands in the Indian Ocean
 Teressa language, the Austroasiatic language spoken on the island

See also 
 Teressa Liane (born 1988), Australian actress
 Teresa (disambiguation)